Norberto Romuáldez y López (June 6, 1875 – November 4, 1941), often referred to as Norberto Romuáldez Sr. to distinguish him from his son with the same name, was a Philippine writer, politician, jurist, and statesman. He was the first Lopez-Romuáldez to attain national prominence, and is deemed the "Father of the Law on the National Language". He was the eldest son of Doña Trinidad Lopez-Romualdez, the Romualdez grand matriarch, and uncle of First Lady of the Philippines Imelda Romualdez Marcos, the daughter of his youngest brother Vicente Orestes Lopez Romualdez.

Biography
Born to the prominent Lopez clan of Leyte (originally from Granada in the Andalusian region of Spain), he is the grandson of Spanish friar and silversmith Don Francisco Lopez. Romuáldez grew up in Leyte, where the Lopez family owned vast coconut and abacá plantations, and first achieved status as a writer in the Waray language. His first Waray zarzuela was An Pagtabang ni San Miguel (The Aid of Saint Michael).

In 1908, Romuáldez wrote Bisayan Grammar and Notes on Bisayan Rhetoric and Poetic and Filipino Dialectology, a treatise on the grammar of the Waray language. The following year (1909) he founded the Sanghiran san Binisaya ha Samar ug Leyte (Academy of the Visayan Language of Samar and Leyte) for the purpose of promoting and intellectualizing Waray. Romuáldez was also fluent in other languages like Spanish, English, and Cebuano.

Romuáldez served as an Associate Justice of the Philippine Supreme Court during the American Period. He was also a participant in the 1934-1935 Constitutional Convention which resulted in the 1935 Constitution for the Philippine Commonwealth. He was later elected as assemblyman from the 4th district of Leyte through a special election in 1936. He was re-elected in 1938. 

Romuáldez ran for senator in 1941. However, he died on November 4, 1941, a week before the election, after an undisclosed illness. A book written about his niece's life notes that he died of a heart attack in Samar.

Writings

Published works
1899: An Pagtabang ni San Miguel ("The Aid of Saint Michael"; drama)
1908: Bisayan Grammar and Notes on Bisayan Rhetoric and Poetic and Filipino Dialectology (linguistics)
1914: Tagbanwa Alphabet with Some Reforms Proposed (essays)
1918: Philippine Orthography (essays)
1921: An Anak han Manaranggot ("The Tuba Gatherer's Child", drama)
1925: The Psychology of the Filipino (lectures)
1931: Filipino Musical Instruments and Airs of Long Ago (lectures)
1933: Philippine Legal and Business Forms Annotated; co-authored with Enrique P. Custodio

References

See also
Lope K. Santos

Visayan people
1875 births
1941 deaths
Writers from Leyte (province)
Politicians from Leyte (province)
Linguists from the Philippines
Filipino Roman Catholics
Filipino writers
Associate Justices of the Supreme Court of the Philippines
Commissioners of the Bureau of Customs of the Philippines
Waray-language writers
Norberto
Filipino people of Spanish descent